This article relates the Schrödinger equation with the path integral formulation of quantum mechanics using a simple nonrelativistic one-dimensional single-particle Hamiltonian composed of kinetic and potential energy.

Background

Schrödinger's equation
Schrödinger's equation, in bra–ket notation, is

where  is the Hamiltonian operator.

The Hamiltonian operator can be written

where  is the potential energy, m is the mass and we have assumed for simplicity that there is only one spatial dimension .

The formal solution of the equation is

where we have assumed the initial state is a free-particle spatial state .

The transition probability amplitude for a transition from an initial state  to a final free-particle spatial state  at time  is

Path integral formulation
The path integral formulation states that the transition amplitude is simply the integral of the quantity

over all possible paths from the initial state to the final state. Here  is the classical action.

The reformulation of this transition amplitude, originally due to Dirac and conceptualized by Feynman, forms the basis of the path integral formulation.

From Schrödinger's equation to the path integral formulation

even if  and  do not commute.

We can divide the time interval  into  segments of length

The transition amplitude can then be written

Although the kinetic energy and potential energy operators do not commute, the Trotter product formula, cited above, says that over each small time-interval, we can ignore this noncommutativity and write

For notational simplicity, we delay making this substitution for the moment.

We can insert the identity matrix

 times between the exponentials to yield

We now implement the substitution associated to the Trotter product formula, so that we have, effectively

We can insert the identity

into the amplitude to yield

where we have used the fact that the free particle wave function is

The integral over  can be performed (see Common integrals in quantum field theory) to obtain

The transition amplitude for the entire time period is

If we take the limit of large  the transition amplitude reduces to

where  is the classical action given by

Any possible path of the particle, going from the initial state to the final state, is approximated as a broken line and included in the measure of the integral

This expression actually defines the manner in which the path integrals are to be taken. The coefficient in front is needed to ensure that the expression has the correct dimensions, but it has no actual relevance in any physical application.

This recovers the path integral formulation from Schrödinger's equation.

From path integral formulation to Schrödinger's equation 
The path integral reproduces the Schrödinger equation for the initial and final state even when a potential is present. This is easiest to see by taking a path-integral over infinitesimally separated times.

In this case, to lowest order the potential energy is constant, and only the kinetic energy contribution is nontrivial. (This separation of the kinetic and potential energy terms in the exponent is essentially the Trotter product formula.) The exponential of the action is

The first term rotates the phase of  locally by an amount proportional to the potential energy. The second term is the free particle propagator, corresponding to  times a diffusion process. To lowest order in  they are additive; in any case one has with :

and this is the Schrödinger equation. Note that the normalization of the path integral needs to be fixed in exactly the same way as in the free particle case. An arbitrary continuous potential does not affect the normalization, although singular potentials require careful treatment.

References

Statistical mechanics
Quantum field theory
Schrödinger equation